Pinet is a municipality located in the north-east of the comarca of Vall d'Albaida in the south of the province of Valencia, Valencian Community, Spain, and some 82.6 km from the regional capital, Valencia.

Pinet borders with the following municipalities: Barx, Quatretonda, Gandia and Llutxent, all of which lie within the province of Valencia.

Etymology 
The name of the municipality is derived from the Valencian term pi, meaning “pine tree”.

History and demography
Historically, the village belonged to the barony of Llutxent, under the authority of the Maza family, and subsequently the houses of Mandas and Dos Aguas.

In 1530, Pope Clement VII created the Vicariate of Pinet, which was run under the authority of the Dominicans of Llutxent until 1835.

By 1646, only 20 inhabitants were recorded as living in the municipality following the expulsion of the Moriscos, which was implemented was particular intensity in Valencia.

Towards the end of the 18th century, the population had risen to around 150 inhabitants, before reaching some 300 hundred at the beginning of the 20th century.

By 1920, the population had reached 434 inhabitants, from which point it entered a progressive decline in consonance with the rural flight experienced in many areas throughout Spain during the 20th century.

Economy 

The local economy was traditionally based on a combination of dryland (grape, prune, olive, almond and carob, among others) and irrigation (apple and other fruit) agriculture, dry stone walling and the production of baskets, rugs, espadrilles, hats and other articles made from esparto and palm leaves.

In common with other rural areas throughout Spain, these activities have been in decline since the mid-20th century, their place having been taken by livestock farming (poultry and pig farming), services, construction and tourism.

Geography and topography 
Pinet is located in the north-east of the Valle de Albaida comarca and covers an area of 11.9 km2.

It is situated at the head of a horse-shoe shaped valley, the surface of which is composed of reddish marl deposited by water erosion originating in the mountains that lie at its north-easterly and northern extremes.

The municipality’s altitude ranges from 466 metres above sea level in its most southerly point, to 700 metres above sea level in the area known as Alto del Collado dels Caragols, located in its north east. The village of Pinet lies at an altitude of 348 metres.
 
Pinet is located on the poorly-defined Pinet Syncline, which runs from North-North West to South-South East. This structure would appear to have been formed by two large, vertical faults.

River Pinet  
The River Pinet runs through the municipality from north to south, running eventually into the River Vernisa, which is in turn an affluent of the River Serpis.

As is characteristic with the rivers and streams in the region, the River Pinet is a wash, that is, a stream bed that is dry during the summer months and which carries abundant water following the typical heavy rains known as cold drop which fall in autumn and spring.

Climate 
The municipality enjoys a typically Mediterranean climate, characterised by hot summers and relatively cold winters, with an average of two snowfalls per year. The climate is rated Csa in accordance with the Köppen climate classification system.

The average annual temperature is around 17 °C, with maximums in summer of 45 °C and minimum in winter of -7 °C.
 
Rainfall averages around 600 mm per year, although recent years have seen volumes of more than 1000 mm, mainly due to the large downpours to which the area is subject during the autumn as a result of the weather phenomenon known as cold drop.

Flora and fauna 

The predominant vegetation in the lower valley is that associated with dryland fruit farming (almonds, olives, apricots, etc.), whilst the surrounding mountains host pine and cork forests and shrubland, interspersed with holly oak and wild herbs and plants such as silene diclinis, laurel, snapdragon, honeysuckle, rosemary, thyme, oregano, etc.

The forested areas are home to such animal species as Bonelli's eagle, golden eagle, short-toed snake eagle, common bent-wing bat, finch and greenfinch, whilst the fruit trees are host to such species as titmice, sparrow, blackbird, golden oriole, wren, nightingale, Cetti's warbler and wagtail, among others.

There are also wild boar and rabbit present in the area.

El Surar 

El Surar (in Spanish, El Paraje Natural Municipal de El Surar[2]), the southernmost cork oak forest in Valencia, is a Municipal Natural Park located in the municipalities of Pinet and Llutxent.

Declared a Municipal Natural Park by Generalitat Valenciana on March 4, 2005, it can be accessed on foot, by bicycle, on horseback or by car via signposted roads and tracks from the village of Pinet.

Route of the Monasteries of Valencia 

Pinet lies on the Route of the Monasteries of Valencia (GR-236), a religious and cultural route that connects five monasteries located in central region of the Province of Valencia, (Valencian Community).

Of the Route’s four different itineraries, three (by foot, on horseback and by MTB) cross through Pinet, with a separate variant also passing through El Surar.

Monuments and festivities

Parish church of St. Peter the Apostle  
The 18th-century parish church of St. Peter the Apostle has a single nave with chapels set between masonry buttresses.

Patron Saint festivities 
Pinet celebrates its main festivities during the last weekend of  June in honour  St. Peter and the Christ of the Mountain.

Pinet “Llata” Festival 
A fair held in late summer in celebration of Pinet’s traditional craft of manufacturing products from esparto and palm leaves. Includes practical demonstrations, workshops and a culinary fair with local gastronomic dishes.

Transport 
The only road within the municipality is the CV-608, which connects the village of Pinet with the village of Llutxent, which lies on the CV-610 regional road, joining the towns of Gandia and Xàtiva.

Gallery

See also
 Route of the Monasteries of Valencia
 El Surar

References

External links

Municipalities in the Province of Valencia
Vall d'Albaida
Valencian Community